Neutral or Neutral Huron was the Iroquoian language spoken by the Neutral Nation.

The name Neutral, given to them by the French, reflected their attempt to stay neutral in the Huron–Iroquois wars. They were called Attawandaron by the Huron.

Mithun (1979:145, 188-189) cites Jesuits pointing out that the Neutral language was different from the Wendat language, in that the Neutrals were "vne Nation differente de langage, au moins en plusieurs choses" (Thwaites 21.188) / "a Nation different in language, at least in many respects" (Thwaites 21.189). Mithun further cites work by Roy Wright (Mithun 1979:160) where the latter notes from the Neutral name given to Chaumonot that the Neutral language did not have sound changes that distinguish Wendat from other Northern Iroquoian languages. Hanzeli (1969), referencing Thwaites (21:228-230), notes Brébeuf and Chaumonot considered Neutral different enough from Wendat to write a separate Neutral grammar and dictionary, now lost.

References

Notes

Neutral people
Northern Iroquoian languages
Extinct languages of North America